A by-election was held for the New South Wales Legislative Assembly electorate of Paddington on 20 February 1880 because John Sutherland resigned when his company accepted a government contract to re-roll railway rails.

Dates

Result

John Sutherland resigned.

See also
Electoral results for the district of Paddington
List of New South Wales state by-elections

References

1880 elections in Australia
New South Wales state by-elections
1880s in New South Wales